is a town located in Kamikawa Subprefecture, Hokkaido, Japan.

As of September 2016, the town has an estimated population of approximately 6,662 and a density of 33 persons per km2. The total area is 204.95 km2.

Gastronomy
Local specialties include densuke watermelons (でんすけスイカ) known throughout Japan, and imazuri mai rice, voted "Most Delicious Rice In Hokkaido 7 Years In A Row".  Watermelon-flavored soft-serve ice cream, ramen noodles, senbei and more are available year-round at the town's Roadside Station or Michi no Eki (道の駅), located on National Route 39.

Tourism
In the late 1990s, the town government embarked on a campaign to make Tohma the number one "sports town" in Japan.  While bubble-era funding eventually dried up, a number of first rate sports facilities and tourist attractions are still in operation today.  Among these are a campground, large children's obstacle course, tennis courts, soccer, baseball and softball fields, park golf course, ski slope (beginner level with 1 rope lift only) and sports center.  In addition, the town is also home to the Papillion Chateau insect museum, the Tōma Shōnyūdō Limestone Cave (one of the few in Hokkaido), and Healthy Chateau, a medium-sized hot spring.

Culture

Mascot

He is a green dragon. Because he is based on a local legend, he resides at the Toma Limestone Cave.

References

External links

Official Website 

Towns in Hokkaido